is a former Japanese football player.

Playing career
Yashiro was born in Ibaraki Prefecture on December 10, 1974. After graduating from high school, he joined Prefectural Leagues club Prima Ham Tsuchiura (later Mito HollyHock) in 1993. He played many matches and the club was promoted to Regional Leagues from 1994, Japan Football League from 1997 and J2 League from 2000. However his opportunity to play decreased from 1999 and he retired end of 2000 season.

Club statistics

References

External links

1974 births
Living people
Association football people from Ibaraki Prefecture
Japanese footballers
J2 League players
Japan Football League (1992–1998) players
Japan Football League players
Mito HollyHock players
Association football defenders